Zia Denise Marie Padilla Quizon (born September 23, 1991), known by her stage name Zia Quizon, is a Filipino singer-songwriter and recording artist. She began her career after being signed to PolyEast Records and releasing her self-titled debut album in 2011.

Biography
Zia Denise Marie Padilla Quizon was born on September 23, 1991. She is the daughter of actor and comedian Dolphy Quizon and actress and singer Zsa Zsa Padilla. She was raised with her older half-sister Karylle and younger sister, Nicole. She has seventeen half-siblings through her father's previous relationships.

Career
Quizon made her debut in October 2011 with an original song called "Ako Na Lang", which was written and produced by Jungee Marcelo. It was the first single from her self-titled debut album. The song was received well commercially and its music video peaked at No. 1 on Myx chart. She then released a second single called "Dear Lonely", written by Kiko Salazar. Her self-titled debut album, Zia, consists of six tracks with three being original composition and the other being covers. She later received many awards for the work from the album including a "Favorite New Artist" award from Myx and a Gold Record Award from ASAP.

On July 7, 2013, she announced that her second studio album be released and will contain mainly original composition than her previous album. The first single from the album premiered on July 8 at My Only Radio FM radio station titled, "Bakit Hindi Ka Crush Ng Crush Mo?", the official theme song for the film of the same name. The song was written by Jungee Marcelo who also wrote her debut single. The music video for the song was released on ABSstarcinema's YouTube channel on July 23. The video's plot features Quizon at a photo shoot session while being pursued by a man who works on set, played by Ramon Bautista who is also the author of the book which the film was based on. The title of her second studio album was later announced to be "A Little Bit Of Lovin'''" and was released digitally on July 18. The album contains ten tracks as opposed to her debut album, with eighth original tracks and two covers of "Seven Nation Army" by American rock duo The White Stripes and "Masdan Mo Ang Kapaligiran" from Pinoy rock band Asin. The carrier single "Pasakalye", premiered on July 16.

Personal life
Quizon went to De La Salle University. On July 10, 2012, Quizon's father died at the age of 83. She was in a relationship with Robin Nievera.

Filmography

Discography
{|class=wikitable
|-
!Year
!Album Title and Singles Released
!width=130|Recording Company
!width=100|PARI Certification
|-
|2011
|ZiaAko Na Lang
Dear Lonely
|*PolyEast EMI
|Gold
|-
|2013
|A Little Bit Of Lovin' 
Katulad Ng Iba (Duet With Gloc 9)
 Bakit Hindi Ka Crush Ng Crush Mo
Pasakalye
|*PolyEast EMI
| —
|}

Awards
2012 – Gold Record Award for her Debut Album (ASAP'')
2012 – MYX Music Awards 2012: Favorite New Artist
2012 – Awit Award for Best Performance by a Female Recording Artist "Ako Na Lang”
2012 – Awit Award for Best Performance by A New Female Recording Artist "Ako Na Lang”
2012 – Awit Award for Song of the Year  "Ako Na Lang”
2012 – Awit Award for Best Engineered Recording: “Simple Girl”
2013 GMMSF Box-Office Entertainment Awards – Promising Female Singer/Performer
2014 – Awit Awards for Best Performance by a Female Recording Artist – "Pasakalye" & Best Song Written for Movie/TV/Stage Play – "Bakit Di Ka Crush Ng Crush Mo?"

References

External links
Official Website 

1991 births
Living people
Filipino television actresses
Filipino television personalities
Contraltos
Filipino singer-songwriters
Star Magic
Zia
Quizon family
De La Salle University alumni
PolyEast Records artists
21st-century Filipino women singers